Samson and Delilah is a painting long attributed to the Flemish Baroque painter Peter Paul Rubens (1577–1640) and displayed in the National Gallery. It dates from about 1609 to 1610. 

Two preliminary copies of the painting exist today: an ink and wash drawing on paper, and an oil sketch on wood panel. The oil sketch is currently on display in the Cincinnati Art Museum, while the ink sketch is held by a private collection in Amsterdam.

Narrative
Rubens portrays the moment when, Samson having fallen asleep on Delilah's lap, a young man cuts Samson's hair. Samson and Delilah are in a dark room, which is lit mostly by a candle held by an old woman to Delilah's left. Delilah is depicted with all of her clothes, but with her breasts exposed. Her left hand is on top of Samson's right shoulder, as his left arm is draped over her legs. The man snipping Samson's hair is crossing his hands, which is a sign of betrayal. Philistine soldiers can be seen in the right-hand background of the painting. The niche behind Delilah contains a statue of the Venus, the Goddess of love, and her son, Cupid. Notably, Cupid's mouth is bound, rather than his eyes. This statue can be taken to represent the cause of Samson's fate and the tool of Delilah's actions.

The painting depicts an episode from the Old Testament story of Samson and Delilah (Judges 16). Samson was a Hebrew hero known for fighting the Philistines. Having fallen in love with Delilah, who has been bribed by the Philistines, Samson tells her the secret of his great strength: his uncut hair. Without his strength, Samson is captured by the Philistines. The old woman standing behind Delilah, providing further light for the scene, does not appear in the biblical narrative of Samson and Delilah. She is believed to be a procuress, and the adjacent profiles of her and Delilah may symbolise the old woman's past, and Delilah's future.

Provenance
The painting was originally commissioned by Nicolaas II Rockox, Lord mayor of Antwerp, Belgium, for his Rockox House. In addition to being a patron, Rockox was a close personal friend of Rubens. The painting was specifically intended to be placed above a 7-foot mantelshelf, where the painting would have been seen from below. The painting was publicly sold for charity when Rockox died in 1640, but it is unknown who the painting was sold to. In 1700, a panel named Samson and Delilah was bought by Prince Johann Adams Andreas I. This painting was likely Rubens' painting. However, when the painting was part of the Liechtenstein Collection in Vienna, Austria in the eighteenth century, the painter was identified as Jan van den Hoecke, who was a principal assistant of Rubens in the 1630s. The painting was then sold in 1880 in Paris, where it was later found by Ludwig Burchard in 1929. Eventually, the painting sold at auction in 1980 at Christie's, purchased by the National Gallery, London for $5 million.

The painting was earlier attributed to the Dutch painter Gerard van Honthorst, a painter who, like Rubens, worked in Rome in the shadow of Caravaggio at the start of the 17th century.

There has been some doubt cast over the attribution of the painting to Rubens, led by the artist and scholar of Fayum portraits Euphronsyne Doxiades. She argues that it varies in details from copies of the original made during Rubens' lifetime, that it does not employ the layering technique of glazing common in oil painting at the time and mastered by Rubens, and that its provenance can not be documented with certainty between 1641 and 1929. A dendrochronological examination of the painting, however, confirms that the painting dates to the correct period, and the attribution has been accepted by a majority of the art historical scholarly community.

However, in September 2021, an artificial intelligence analysis conducted by Dr. Carina Popovici and Art Recognition, a Swiss company based near Zurich, seemed to confirm doubters' beliefs when it was announced there is a 91% probability that artwork was not painted by Rubens.

Painting materials
The painting was cleaned and investigated in the National Gallery in 1983. It is noteworthy for the masterful and elaborate painting of the draperies and for the absence of blue pigments. Rubens employed carmine (kermes) lake, lead-tin-yellow, vermilion and ochres in addition to lead white and charcoal black. However chemical pigment analysis was in its early stages back then and not enough samples for other works by Rubens were available, compared to what is available nowadays.

Legacy

Jacob Matham, a Haarlem printmaker, used the Cincinnati oil sketch of Samson and Delilah as a modello for an engraving he made in circa 1613. The engraving is a reverse image of Samson and Delilah.

The painting of Samson and Delilah can be seen in Frans Fracken the Younger's painting Banquet at the House of Burgomaster Rockox, where the painting is hanging above the mantlepiece. Notably, this seventeenth-century depiction of the original Rubens painting shows Samson's foot included wholly within the frame of the composition. Compared to it the version now on display in London's National Gallery is cropped on both left and right sides. Also there are five soldiers in the doorway compared to three in Fracken's picture and in early engravings.

Notes

Further reading
 Xenia Ressos, Samson und Delila in der Kunst von Mittelalter und Früher Neuzeit (= Studien zur internationalen Architektur- und Kunstgeschichte, Band 108), Imhof, Petersberg 2014, 
 Christopher Brown, Rubens’ Samson and Delilah, London: National Gallery, 1983

External links
 Samson and Delilah at the National Gallery, London
 Samson and Delilah at the Web Gallery of Art
 Article about the controversy at Salon.com
 AfterRubens.com, the Site of Euphronsyne Doxiades
  A self-published Geocities page about the painting
 Rubens, Samson and Delilah, at ColourLex

Paintings by Peter Paul Rubens in the National Gallery, London
Paintings depicting Samson
Collection of the Cincinnati Art Museum
1610 paintings